Esteverena Point is the rocky point projecting 700 m into Boyd Strait to form the west extremity of Snow Island in the South Shetland Islands, Antarctica.  The feature is named by Argentina.

Location

Map
 L.L. Ivanov. Antarctica: Livingston Island and Greenwich, Robert, Snow and Smith Islands. Scale 1:120000 topographic map.  Troyan: Manfred Wörner Foundation, 2009.

References
 SCAR Composite Antarctic Gazetteer.

Headlands of the South Shetland Islands